Karin Peretz (born 7 October 1990) is an Israeli football forward, currently playing in the Israeli First League for Maccabi Be'er Sheva.

Club career
Born in Be'er Sheva, Peretz played during her entire career with Maccabi Be'er Sheva, reaching the Israeli Women's Cup final in 2010 and winning the League's second division with the club in 2014–15, as well as finishing as top scorer in the second division at the same season. During summer 2015, Peretz had to have surgery in her knee, missing the beginning of the 2015–16 season.

International career
Peretz played for the U-19 national team in 2007 and 2008, appearing in 5 matches.

References

External links
 

1990 births
Living people
Israeli women's footballers
Maccabi Be'er Sheva F.C. (women) players
Women's association football forwards
Footballers from Beersheba